Kazakhstanosaurus (meaning "Kazakhstan lizard") is an extinct genus of undorosaurid ichthyosaur from the Late Jurassic of Kazakhstan and Russia. Two species are known: the type, K. efimovi, and K. shchuchkinensis, both named and described in 2021.

Discovery and naming
The holotype of K. efimovi was discovered in 2016 by a group of school children and was excavated by Vladimir A. Efimov and Olga Subbotina and the fossils of both species were prepared by Dzhamilya Yakupova. Both species were eventually named and described in 2021 by Yakupova Bolatovna and Akhmemenov Maksutovich, although the paper naming Kazakhstanosaurus was first submitted in 2019. The holotype is also set to be put on display at Nazarbayev University, Kazakhstan.

Description
Based on the known remains, K. efimovi was slightly larger than K. shchuchkinensis.

Classification
Bolatovna and Makustovich (2021) found Kazakhstanosaurus to be the sister taxon to the contemporaneous Undorosaurus. It also was placed in the Undorosauridae in 2021 and was likely an ancestor of Undorosaurus itself.

References 

Ichthyosaurs
Fossil taxa described in 2021